is a railway station in the town of Aga, Higashikanbara District, Niigata Prefecture, Japan, operated by East Japan Railway Company (JR East).

Lines

Station layout
The station consists of one side platform serving a single bi-directional track on an embankment, connected to the station building by a tunnel. The station is unattended.

History
The station opened on 1 November 1914. With the privatization of Japanese National Railways (JNR) on 1 April 1987, the station came under the control of JR East.

Surrounding area
 Agano River
 
 Toyomi Post Office

See also
 List of railway stations in Japan

External links

 JR East station information 

Railway stations in Niigata Prefecture
Ban'etsu West Line
Railway stations in Japan opened in 1914
Aga, Niigata